Rodrigo Ruiz Zárate (14 April 1923 – 5 May 1999) was a Mexican football defender who played for Mexico in the 1950 FIFA World Cup. He also played for C.D. Guadalajara.

References

External links
FIFA profile

1923 births
1999 deaths
Mexican footballers
Mexico international footballers
Association football defenders
C.D. Guadalajara footballers
1950 FIFA World Cup players